Havij (also Romanized as Havīj) is a village in Qaleh Asgar Rural District, Lalehzar District, Bardsir County, Kerman Province, Iran. The word "havij" literally means carrot in Persian language. At the 2006 census, its population was 141, in 31 families.

References 

Populated places in Bardsir County